In finance the put/call ratio (or put-call ratio, PCR) is a technical indicator demonstrating investor sentiment. The ratio represents a proportion between all the put options and all the call options purchased on any given day. The put/call ratio can be calculated for any individual stock, as well as for any index, or can be aggregated.

Readings
Generally, a lower reading (~0.6) of the ratio reflects a bullish sentiment among investors as they buy more calls, anticipating an uptrend. Conversely, a higher reading (~1.02) of the ratio indicates a bearish sentiment in the market. However, the ratio is considered to be a contrarian indicator, so that an extreme reading above 1.0 is actually a bullish signal and vice versa.

The lowest level of the index was 0.39x, set in March 2000 at the peak of the dot-com bubble.

See also
VIX index
IVX

References

External links
The CBOE Put-Call Ratio: A Useful Greed & Fear Contrarian Indicator? – A Statistical Analysis
CBOE Volume & Put/Call Ratios
Options offer traders lots of… well, options!
Put/Call Ratio Soaring
Historical Put/Call Ratio by Stock
What is Put Call Ratio? In Hindi

Technical indicators
Options (finance)
Financial ratios